Tyropoeon Valley (Greek:   i.e., "Valley of the Cheesemakers") is the name given by Josephus the historian (Wars 5.140) to the valley or rugged ravine, in the Old City of Jerusalem, which in ancient times separated Mount Moriah from Mount Zion and emptied into the valley of Hinnom. 

The Tyropoeon, filled over the centuries with a vast accumulation of debris, and almost a plain, was spanned by bridges, the most noted of which was Zion Bridge, which was probably the ordinary means of communication between the royal palace on Zion and the temple.

The western wall of the Temple Mount rose up from the bottom of this valley to the height of 84 feet, where it was on a level with the area, and above this, and as a continuance of it, the wall of Solomon's cloister rose to the height of about 50 feet, "so that this section of the wall would originally present to view a stupendous mass of masonry scarcely to be surpassed by any mural masonry in the world."

In the Copper Scroll this valley is called in Hebrew the Outer Valley (3Q15 col.8, line 4). The name  possibly arose as an ancient mistranslation from Hebrew to the Greek of Josephus's book; Semitic languages use the same root for outer and congeal.

See also
Geography of Israel

References

Ancient Israel and Judah
Geography of Jerusalem
Hebrew Bible valleys